Rani Balbir Kaur is a Punjabi theater personality living in India.

Awards 
In 2015, Rani Balbir Kaur was selected for the Sangeet Natak Akademi Award.

References

Living people
Indian stage actresses
Indian theatre directors
Punjabi women
Year of birth missing (living people)
Recipients of the Sangeet Natak Akademi Award